Ostapchuk is a surname. Notable people with the surname include:

Nadzeya Ostapchuk (born 1980), Belarusian shot putter
Sergei Ostapchuk (1990–2011), Belarusian ice hockey player
Yuliya Ostapchuk (born 1989), Ukrainian freestyle wrestler

See also
 

Ukrainian-language surnames